Bruno Amaro Sousa Barros (born 17 February 1983), known as Amaro, is a Portuguese former professional footballer who played mainly as a central midfielder.

He amassed Primeira Liga totals of 216 matches and 18 goals over 11 seasons, representing mainly Nacional (four years).

Club career
A product of hometown F.C. Penafiel's youth system, Amaro was born in the village of Paço de Sousa and played with the club as a professional during five seasons, three in the second division and two in the Primeira Liga. In September 2006 he joined C.D. Nacional, still playing the first game of the campaign with his previous team; his official debut with the Madeirans came on the 9th, in a 0–1 home loss against Sporting CP.

Amaro finished his debut season in the first division with five goals in 25 matches, but appeared less significantly in the following years. For 2009–10, he served a season-long loan spell at Académica de Coimbra – teammate Miguel Fidalgo also moved to that club on loan.

At only three goals, Amaro was crowned Vitória de Setúbal's top scorer in the 2011–12 campaign – notably scoring the game's only goal at home against Sporting – as the side again narrowly avoided relegation.

References

External links

1983 births
Living people
People from Penafiel
Portuguese footballers
Association football midfielders
Primeira Liga players
Liga Portugal 2 players
Segunda Divisão players
F.C. Penafiel players
C.D. Nacional players
Associação Académica de Coimbra – O.A.F. players
Vitória F.C. players
F.C. Arouca players
F.C. Felgueiras 1932 players
Portugal youth international footballers
Portugal under-21 international footballers
Portugal B international footballers
Sportspeople from Porto District